Panshan County is a county in the central part of Liaoning province, China. It is under the administration of the prefecture-level city of Panjin and occupies its northern third. The county's postal code is 124000, and the county government is located in Shuangtaizi District.

Administrative divisions

Panshan County administers nine towns and five rural townships.

Towns:
Taiping, Hujia, Gaosheng, Guchengzi, Shaling, Baqiangzi, Yangjuanzi, Dongguo, Shixin, Wujia

Townships:
Lujia Township, Tianshui Township, Dahuang Township, Chenjia Township

Climate

References

External links

County-level divisions of Liaoning
Panjin